This is a list of television stations in Mauritius, available on digital terrestrial, satellite, internet streaming and cable systems.

Governmental television

MBC

 MBC 1
 MBC 2
 MBC 2
 BTV Mauritius
 Senn Kreol
 YSTV
 Zoom
 BBC News
 Bhojpuri Channel
 Ciné 12
 DD National
 DD India
 DD Podhigai
 DD Sahyadri
 DD Saptagiri
 DD Urdu
 Kids Channel (Closed in 2015)

IP television

My.T (IPTV) 

 Aaj Tak
 NTN 24
 Abu Dhabi TV
 Channel 3
 Das Erste
 kix
 Zee News
 Ginx eSports TV 
 ATN News
 Channel 20
 Press TV
 Baby TV
 Rai Italia
 Telefe Internacional
 Da Vinci Kids
 CBBC Channel
 CBeebies
 EWTN
 Love Nature
 MSNBC
 VTV4
 NFL Network
 MTV Live HD
 RTL Television
 TRT World
 3sat                               
 ZDF
 MBC TV
 BFM TV
 Sky News
 Star Plus
 Star Bharat
 Pro TV International
 The Learning Channel
 RTS SAT
 SFR Sport 1
 SFR Sport 2
 SFR Sport 3
 SFR Sport 5
 Star Chinese Movies
 Star Chinese Channel
 Channel V
 Golf Channel
 CCTV-13
 BBC World News
 France 24
 KBS World
 TVE International
 RTP Internacional
 Fashion TV
 AB1
 Cinema One
BBC Earth
 AB 3
 AB Moteurs
 Action
 Al Jazeera English                    
 ARY Digital
 Arirang TV
 B4U Movies
 YTN World
 Bhojpuri Channel                  
 Bindass
 Bloomberg TV
 Cartoon Network
 CCTV-4
 CGTN Documentary
 CCTV-F
 CGTN
 CCTV-8
 Cine 12
 Clubbing TV
 CNBC Europe
 CNN International
 Colors TV
 CTI Asia
 DW-TV                             
 E!
 SkyNews
 Euronews
 Eurosport News
 Fashion One
 Travel Channel
 Fox Life
 Fox Sports English
 Fox Sports Français
 Fox Sports 2
 Foxnews
 GMA Pinoy TV
 GMA Life TV
 GMA News TV International
 RT Documentary
 A.Side TV
 Outdoor Channel
 Travel + Escape (TV Channel)
 Golf Channel
 Gulli
 India Today
 Jaya TV
 La Chaîne Info
 Russia Today
 M6
 Mangas
 MBC 1
 MBC 2
 MBC 3
 BTV
 MBC 16 URDU
 MCM
 MTV India
 My.T VOD
 myZen TV
 TVRI
 Nat Geo Wild
 National Geographic Channel
 NDTV India
 NDTV 24x7
 NDTV Good Times
 NDTV Profit
 NHK World TV 
 NHK World Premium
OCS Max HD
OCS City
OCS Choc
OCS Geant
OCS Go
 Rishtey
 RFM TV
 The Fight Network
 NFL Network
 Sony Pal
 Times Now                   
 TOONAMI
 RTL9
 SABC News International
 Science & Vie TV
 Senn Kreol
 YSTV
 STAR Gold                       
 STAR Vijay                          
 Star Chinese Channel                  
 The Filipino Channel                 
 Kapatid Channel
 Movies Now
 TCM Cinema
 TF1 HD
 TMC
 Sony Entertainment Television
 Sab TV
 UTV Movies
 W9
 6TER

Online private television

 ION News
 Teleplus
 TopTV Mauritius
 L'Express
 MBC Web TV

External television

Canalsat 

 13EME RUE
 ACTION
 ANTENNE REUNION
 BBC WORLD
 C8
 CANAL+ CINEMA HD
 CANAL+ FAMILY HD
 CANAL+ HD
 CANAL+ SERIES HD
 CANAL+ SPORT 2 HD
 CANAL+ SPORT 3 HD
 CANAL+ SPORT HD
 CANAL EVENEMENT
 CINE+ CLASSIC
 CINE+ CLUB
 CINE+ EMOTION
 CINE+ FAMIZ
 CINE+ FRISSON
 CINE+ PREMIER HD
 COLORS
 COMEDIE+
 CSTAR
 DISCOVERY CHANNEL
 DISCOVERY SCIENCE
 DISNEY CHANNEL
 DISNEY CINEMA HD
 DISNEY JUNIOR
 DISNEY XD               
 ELLE GIRL
 ENGLISH CLUB TV
 EQUIDIA LIVE
 EURONEWS
 EUROSPORT 1 HD
 EUROSPORT 2
 GAME ONE
 HISTOIRE
 i TELE
 INFOSPORT+
 IQRAA
 KANAL AUSTRAL
 KOMBAT SPORT
 KTO                               
 LCI
 LCP
 LIVING FOODZ
 M6 HD
 MBC SAT
 MCM
 MEZZO
 MTV
 MTV HITS
 MTV INDIA
 MUTV
 NAT GEO WILD HD
 NATIONAL GEOGRAPHIC HD                     
 NBA TV
 NICKELODEON
 NOVELAS TV
 NRJ12
 OCS CHOC
 OCS CITY
 OCS GEANTS
 OCS MAX HD
 ORTC
 PARAMOUNT HD
 PARIS PREMIERE
 PIWI+
 PLANETE+ A&E
 PLANETE+ CI
 PLANETE+ HD
 REUNION 1ERE
 RFM TV
 RTL9
 RUGBY+
 SEASONS
 SERIE CLUB
 Sony MAX
 STAR Gold
 STAR Plus
 SYFY
 TELE KREOL
 TELETOON+
 TEST
 TEVA
 TF1 HD
 TIMES NOW
 TMC
 TRACE TROPICAL
 TRACE URBAN
 TV BREIZH
 TVM
 USHUAIA TV HD
 VOYAGE
 W9
 Zee Cinema
 ZEE TAMIL
 Zee TV
 ZING

See also 

 MBC 1 (Mauritian TV channel)
 MBC 2 (Mauritian TV channel)
 MBC 3 (Mauritian TV channel)
 Kids Channel (Mauritian TV channel)
 List of newspapers in Mauritius
 List of radio stations in Mauritius
 List of television stations in Africa
 Media of Mauritius

References

Television channels in Mauritius
Television stations
Mauritius